The 8th Platino Awards recognized excellence in the Ibero-American audiovisual industry, presented by the Entidad de Gestión de Derechos de los Productores Audiovisuales (EGEDA) and the Federación Iberoamericana de Productores Cinematográficos y Audiovisuales (FIPCA). The ceremony took place at the IFEMA Palacio Municipal in Madrid, Spain on 3 October 2021, at 19:00 UTC.

The biggest winner of the night was the Colombian film Forgotten We'll Be with five awards (including Best Film, Best Actor and Best Director), whereas the Spanish limited television miniseries Patria was the most successful miniseries or TV series, winning four awards. The Platino Honorary Award was handed to Mexican actor Diego Luna.

Background 

The list of pre-selections was disclosed on 6 May 2021. The 8th awards added new categories both in film and television, Best Series Creator, Best Supporting Actor in Film and Best Supporting Actress in Film.

The film pre-selection had a 8% of titles from Mexico, followed by Argentina, Brazil, Chile, Spain and Portugal (with a 7% each). Regarding the television series, a 18% of titles were from Spain, followed by Mexico (14%), Argentina (12%) and Colombia (11%).

Pending the final nominations, the shortlist of candidates (20 per category) was revealed on 11 June 2021.

The nominations were announced on 19 July 2021 from the Madrid Town Hall by actresses Belén Rueda and Paulina García, director Manolo Caro and presenter Elena Sánchez. Miquel Iceta, Enrique Cerezo, Rebeca Grynspan, Marta Rivera, José Luis Martínez-Almeida and Adrián Solar also attended the event. The "Ibero–American Hymn" composed by Lucas Vidal was presented at the event, commemorating the Day of Ibero–America (19 July). Regarding the film section, the Colombian film Forgotten We'll Be and the Guatemalan film La llorona obtained the most nominations (11). The Spanish series Patria was the television series with the most nominations (5). The official poster was designed by Javier Mariscal.

On 29 September 2021, the organization reported the acts of Ara Malikian, Becky G, Carlos Baute, Natalia Oreiro, Juan Magán, Pedro Capó and Sara Baras in the event, to be presented by Juana Acosta and Luis Gerardo Méndez.

The IB Public's Choice Platino Awards were handed at The Westin Palace Madrid on 2 October, before the night ceremony at the IFEMA Palacio Municipal on 3 October. They were awarded to Manolo Caro's Someone Has to Die (Best Series), Álvaro Morte (Best TV Actor for Money Heist), María Mercedes Coroy (Best Film Actress for La llorona), Diego Peretti (Best Film Actor for   The Heist of the Century) and Cecilia Suárez (Best TV Actress for The House of Flowers).

Categories

Film

Television

Platino Honorary Award

 Diego Luna

Films with multiple nominations and awards 
The following films received multiple nominations:

The following films received multiple awards:

Series with multiple nominations and awards 
The following series and miniseries received multiple nominations:

The following series and miniseries received multiple awards:

References

External links
Official website

2020
2021 film awards
2021 television awards